Alexander Iain Fordyce Munro (born 24 August 1951) is a Scottish former professional football player and manager.

Playing career
Munro was born in Uddingston and began his career at St Mirren making 103 league appearances for the Buddies in four years scoring 16 goals before moving to Hibernian in 1973. He spent three years at Hibs playing in 61 league matches and then joined Rangers for a short spell before making a return to Love Street. Munro spent three years back at St Mirren before moving south to Stoke City where he spent the 1980–81 season making 34 appearances scoring once which came in a 2–1 away victory at Southampton. In the summer of 1981 manager Alan Durban moved to Sunderland and he took Munro up to Roker Park with him. He spent three seasons at Sunderland making 88 appearances and later played with Dundee United and ended his career with a second spell at Hibernian.

Coaching and management
Munro managed Dunfermline Athletic, Dundee, Hamilton Academical, Raith Rovers, and coached Ayr United. His coaching qualifications include the UEFA Pro-licence and the SFA 'A' Licence. He is also a qualified physical education teacher. He has coached soccer in the United States with R.S.L. Florida.

He is currently YSC Director and Union Youth Director at YSC Sports in Wayne, Pennsylvania, United States, a youth soccer center which aims to provide high quality coaching for kids with an aim of developing skills in young players. YSC is the official youth development partner of the Philadelphia Union, a Major League Soccer club.  Munro also does half-time television commentary for the Union's home games.

Career statistics

Club
Source:

International
Source:

References

External links
 
 
 

1951 births
Living people
People from Uddingston
People educated at Uddingston Grammar School
Scottish Football League players
English Football League players
Scottish footballers
Scottish football managers
St Mirren F.C. players
Hibernian F.C. players
Rangers F.C. players
Stoke City F.C. players
Sunderland A.F.C. players
Dundee United F.C. players
Dunfermline Athletic F.C. managers
Dundee F.C. managers
Hamilton Academical F.C. managers
Raith Rovers F.C. managers
Scotland international footballers
Scottish Football League representative players
Association football midfielders
Footballers from South Lanarkshire
Scottish Football League managers
Philadelphia Union non-playing staff